Adrenalina Caribe is a Venezuelan music group. Primarily performing Latin and Tropical music, they formed in 1979 in Caracas.

At the peak of Adrenalina Caribe's popularity, the band released several albums under Venezuelan record label Sonográfica in the 1980s. They were led by Evio di Marzo, who went on to perform with a number of guest-musicians under the same name.

In the evening of May 28, 2018, Evio di Marzo was shot by thieves while resisting being stolen his car in downtown Caracas, Venezuela. Di Marzo was transported to Pérez Carreño Hospital in the same city, where he was pronounced dead on arrival.

Members
Evio di Marzo (†) – vocals, guitar, drums, keyboards
Carlos Pucci – bass, vocals
Orlando Poleo – percussion
Jesús Manzanares – percussion
Alberto Borregales – percussion
Néstor Pérez (†) – percussion
Eleazar Yanes (†) – drummer 
Gerardo López – drummer
Gustavo Aranguren – trumpet
Rodolfo Reyes – sax tenor
Roldán Peña – electric guitar
Roberto Jirón – electric guitar
Alfredo Villamizar – percussion
Glen Tomassi – sax tenor
William Cabrera – piano & keyboards
Jesús Enrique González Keyboards & composer.

Discography
Pico y Pala (Discomoda, 1982)
Adrenalina Caribe (Sonográfica, 1985)
Evio di Marzo (Sonográfica, 1987)
Bio Bio (Sonográfica, 1990)

References

External links
  List of (former) members

Venezuelan musical groups
Musical groups established in 1979
1979 establishments in Venezuela